George Leeke (2 April 1881 – 30 March 1939) was an Irish nationalist politician.

George Leeke was born in Magilligan, son of George Leeke (merchant) and Mary Lurting. Educated at St Columb's College, Leeke owned a hotel and fishery. He was elected to Londonderry County Council for the Nationalist Party.  At the 1921 Northern Ireland general election, Leeke was elected in the Londonderry seat, although he did not take his seat until 1926. In 1929 his seat was abolished, and he instead won the Mid Londonderry seat, which he held until his death in 1939. He was active in the Ancient Order of Hibernians.

References

1881 births
1939 deaths
Irish businesspeople
Members of the House of Commons of Northern Ireland 1921–1925
Members of the House of Commons of Northern Ireland 1925–1929
Members of the House of Commons of Northern Ireland 1929–1933
Members of the House of Commons of Northern Ireland 1933–1938
Members of the House of Commons of Northern Ireland 1938–1945
Nationalist Party (Ireland) members of the House of Commons of Northern Ireland
People educated at St Columb's College
Politicians from Derry (city)
Councillors in Northern Ireland
Members of the House of Commons of Northern Ireland for County Londonderry constituencies